Mariko Elizabeth Montero Alley is an American-born Filipino footballer who played as a midfielder. She has been a member of the Philippines women's national team.

Early life
Alley was raised in Prichard, West Virginia.

College and club career
Alley was signed up to play for the women's soccer team of the West Virginia University, the West Virginia Mountaineers in 2006. She also played for Charlotte Soccer Club at the Super Y league.

International career
In 2003, while playing at the USA Cup in Minnesota, Alley met and was scouted by Philippines men's national team coach Aris Caslib who watched some of her games. In October 2005, the Philippine Football Federation contacted her and team manager Ernie Nierras invited her to the women's national team.

Alley was part of the Philippine women's national team that participated at the 2005 Southeast Asian Games where she made a goal against Indonesia. She was a starting player in all four matches of the Philippine national team.

Career statistics

International goals
Scores and results list the Philippines' goal tally first.

Personal life
Alley's parents are Marlene Montero-Alley, her mother who comes from Samar, Philippines and Hugh Alley, her father. She is married to Dennis Gagai since 1 August 2015.

References

1980s births
Living people
Citizens of the Philippines through descent
Filipino women's footballers
Women's association football midfielders
Philippines women's international footballers
Filipino people of American descent
Sportspeople from Huntington, West Virginia
People from Wayne County, West Virginia
Soccer players from West Virginia
American women's soccer players
West Virginia Mountaineers women's soccer players
American sportspeople of Filipino descent
Huntington High School (West Virginia) alumni